Adrian Marcel Hutton (born May 22, 1990) is an American singer, songwriter, and rapper from Oakland, California. In April 2013, he released his first mixtape, 7 Days of Weak. The mixtape was presented by the Grammy Award-winning musician Raphael Saadiq, who took Marcel in as his protégé.

On May 2, 2014, Marcel released his first RIAA-certified gold hit single, "2AM" featuring Sage the Gemini. In July 2014, he released his second mixtape, Weak After Next.

Early life
Starting in 2003, Marcel attended Oakland School for the Arts. He stated that his parents were pivotal in encouraging him to pursue a career in the performing arts. Marcel sang with Mase on the song "Awkward" in 2012.

Discography
Albums:

 #GMFU – Got Me F%^&ed Up (2017)
 98th (2019)

Mixtapes:
 7 Days of Weak (2013)
 Weak After Next (2014)
 Weak After Next Reloaded (2018)

References

External links
 Official website

American rhythm and blues singer-songwriters
Living people
People from Oakland, California
1990 births
Singer-songwriters from California
American contemporary R&B singers
American hip hop singers
African-American male singer-songwriters
21st-century African-American male singers